Committee for a Workers' International (CWI) may refer to:
 Committee for a Workers' International (1974), the first Trotskyist international to adopt the name
 Committee for a Workers' International (2019), which claims to be a continuation of the original CWI
 International Socialist Alternative, which claims to be a successor to the original CWI and used the name "CWI (Majority)" during the latter part of 2019

See also 
 International Revolutionary Left, which also split from the CWI